1,2,4-Triazole (as ligand in coordination compounds, Htrz abbreviation is sometimes used) is one of a pair of isomeric chemical compounds with molecular formula CHN, called triazoles, which have a five-membered ring of two carbon atoms and three nitrogen atoms.  1,2,4-Triazole and its derivatives find use in a wide variety of applications.

Structure and properties
1,2,4-Triazole is a planar molecule. The C-N and N-N distances fall into a narrow range 136 - 132 picometers, consistent with the aromaticity.  Although two tautomers can be envisioned, only one exists practically speaking.

1,2,4-Triazole is amphoteric, being susceptible to both N-protonation and deprotonation in aqueous solution.  The pKa of 1,2,4-triazolium (C2N3H4+) is 2.45.  The pKa of the neutral molecule is 10.26.

Synthesis and occurrence

1,2,4-Triazoles can be prepared using the Einhorn–Brunner reaction or the Pellizzari reaction. Unsubstituted 1,2,4-triazole can be prepared from thiosemicarbazide by acylation with formic acid followed by cyclization of 1-formyl-3-thiosemicarbazide into 1,2,4-triazole-3(5)-thiol; oxidation of the thiol by nitric acid or hydrogen peroxide yields 1,2,4-triazole.

1,2,4-Triazoles are featured in many kinds of drugs. Notable triazoles include the antifungal drugs fluconazole and itraconazole and the plant growth regulator paclobutrazol. Triazolate is a common bridging ligand in coordination chemistry.

References 

Triazoles